Stacy William Long (born 11 January 1985) is an English former professional footballer who played as a midfielder.

Long started his football career at Charlton Athletic in 1995 and progressed through the youth system, spending ten years on the club's books, and although a regular in the reserve team, he did not make a first-team appearance. Before the start of the 2005–06 season, Long joined Notts County after being released from Charlton. He spent one season at the club, before moving into non-league with Ebbsfleet United in July 2006. He played over 135 games for the club, helping them to FA Trophy success in May 2008.

He joined Stevenage in June 2009, and helped the club earn back-to-back promotions from the Conference Premier to League One during his time there. After three years at Stevenage, Long signed for AFC Wimbledon of League Two on a free transfer in June 2012. He was released by Wimbledon a year later, and subsequently re-joined one of his former clubs, Ebbsfleet United, ahead of the 2013–14 season. During his one season back at Ebbsfleet, Long spent time on loan at Eastbourne Borough. He ended his playing career with Leatherhead of the Isthmian League Premier Division, before taking up a coaching role at Ebbsfleet in October 2015, a position he held until November 2018. Long represented England at various youth levels, as well as earning one cap for the England C team in 2008.

Club career

Early career
Long began his football career at Charlton Athletic in 1995 and progressed through the youth system at The Valley. He signed a three-year professional contract in 2002 after impressing manager Alan Curbishley. On signing the contract, Long said "signing a professional contract is what I have always wanted ever since I first came to the club and was playing for the under-8 and under-9 sides". Despite featuring regularly for the reserve team, Long was released in May 2005, ending his ten-year association with the London club. When released, Long said, "the club is in such a strong position now that it is difficult for young players to make the breakthrough".

Ahead of the 2005–06 season, Long joined Notts County on a one-year contract, following his successful trial at the club. He made his debut for the club in a 1–0 victory over Wrexham on 9 August 2005, scoring the winning goal in the 90th-minute. After playing in Notts County's 2–0 home win against Stockport County on 17 December 2005, Long made just four further appearances during the remainder of the season. He played 23 times for Notts County during the 2005–06 season as they narrowly escaped relegation from the Football League, scoring two goals. At the end of the season, he was one of seven players released by the club.

Long subsequently joined Conference National club Gravesend & Northfleet on 26 July 2006. He made his Gravesend debut as a substitute in a 1–0 victory over Woking on 21 October 2006. Long scored his first goal in the same season away at Kidderminster Harriers in a 2–1 victory on 3 March 2007. He made 31 appearances during the 2006–07 season. Long continued playing regularly under Liam Daish in the club's 2007–08 season. He played 47 games in all competitions and scored 14 goals from midfield, which included successive braces against Grays Athletic and Weymouth. Long was also a regular player in the club's successful FA Trophy campaign the same season, playing in all seven games, including the 1–0 win against Torquay United in the final at Wembley Stadium on 10 May 2008. The 2008–09 season saw Long play 49 games for the Kent club, scoring four times.

Stevenage
After being released by the newly renamed Ebbsfleet United at the end of the 2008–09 season, Long joined fellow Conference Premier club Stevenage on a one-year contract on 5 June 2009. He made his debut for the Hertfordshire team in the opening game of the 2009–10 season, starting in a 1–1 draw with Tamworth on 8 August 2009. Long found first-team opportunities limited in the first half of the season, playing just eight times in four months. However, after providing two assists in Stevenage's 4–1 win against Cambridge United on New Year's Day, Long scored his first goal for Stevenage in a 6–0 win over Vauxhall Motors on 19 January 2010. Long played 26 times during the club's 2009–10 season, scoring five goals, as Stevenage finished the season as Conference Premier champions.

Long played his first game of the 2010–11 season, Stevenage's first season in the Football League, in the club's 2–1 defeat to Portsmouth in the League Cup on 9 August 2010, playing 45 minutes of the match. A month later, on 4 September 2010, he started his first game of the season, against Crewe Alexandra, but was sent-off in the 63rd minute of the match for two bookable offences. He remained a regular starter throughout the remainder of 2010, scoring his first goal of the season in a 1–1 home draw against Shrewsbury Town on 23 November 2010. He scored in Stevenage's 3–1 win over Premier League club Newcastle United on 8 January 2011. Long's shot from 25-yards out resulted in Stevenage's first goal, also providing the assist for Michael Bostwick's goal in the same game. Long played 30 games during the 2010–11 season, scoring three goals. This included three appearances in the 2010–11 League Two play-offs following Stevenage's sixth-placed finish. He scored in Stevenage's 2–0 home victory against Accrington Stanley in the semi-final first leg on 15 May 2011, which the club went on to win by a 3–0 aggregate scoreline. Stevenage earned promotion to League One after a 1–0 win against Torquay United at Old Trafford on 28 May 2011, with Long playing the whole game.

He made his first appearance of the 2011–12 season in Stevenage's first ever League One game, coming on as a 71st-minute substitute in a 0–0 draw with Exeter City on 6 August 2011. Long started the next game, a League Cup home tie against Peterborough United on 9 August 2011, scoring in the first half in an eventual 4–3 defeat after extra-time. His first league goal of the season came against one of his former employers, Charlton Athletic, on 15 October 2011. Long's goal was a deflected 25-yard shot that wrongfooted Ben Hamer in the Charlton goal, the goal gave Stevenage a 1–0 victory, consequently ending Charlton's unbeaten league start to the season. He went on to make 32 appearances in all competitions for Stevenage during the season, scoring twice. Despite playing more games during the season than in the two previous years at Stevenage, Long was released when his contract expired in May 2012.

AFC Wimbledon
Long joined League Two club AFC Wimbledon on 12 June 2012, on a free transfer and on a one-year contract. He made his Wimbledon debut in the club's first game of the season, starting in a 3–1 defeat away to his previous employers, Stevenage, in a League Cup fixture on 14 August 2012. Long scored his first goal for the club in AFC Wimbledon's 3–0 away win over York City on 10 November 2012. He made 32 appearances in all competitions during the season, scoring three times, as Wimbledon finished in 20th position, avoiding relegation by two points. Long was released by Wimbledon at the end of the season.

Return to Ebbsfleet
Following his release from AFC Wimbledon, Long took a "significant wage drop" and "rejected better offers from League clubs" to re-join Ebbsfleet United of the Conference South on 8 June 2013. On the move, Long said "I had a great experience here last time – obviously winning the Trophy at Wembley was the highlight for me – but overall it was a fantastic time and I hope to do the same under Steve Brown and achieve great things again". He made his second debut for Ebbsfleet in the club's opening match of the 2013–14 season, playing the first 88 minutes in a 0–0 draw with Havant & Waterlooville on 17 August 2013. Long made 12 appearances for Ebbsfleet during the first half of the season, of which five were from the substitute's bench, scoring two goals.

Due to this, Ebbsfleet manager Steve Brown stated that it was important for Long to "get minutes under his belt", and he was subsequently loaned to fellow Conference South club Eastbourne Borough on an initial one-month deal on 15 January 2014. Long made his Eastbourne debut in a 3–1 defeat to Basingstoke Town on 18 January 2014. He scored his first goal for the club a week later, netting the first goal of the match as Eastbourne secured a 3–2 home victory over Bath City. The loan deal was extended for a further two months and Long went on to score three times in 16 appearances for Eastbourne. He returned to Ebbsfleet in April 2014, but appeared only as an unused substitute for the remaining fixtures of the season. Long was released by the club at the end of the season.

Leatherhead
Following his release from Ebbsfleet, Long joined newly promoted Isthmian League Premier Division club Leatherhead on initial non-contract terms in August 2014. Long scored on his debut for Leatherhead in the club's 2–1 home victory over AFC Hornchurch on 23 August 2014. He subsequently signed a one-year contract with the club on 29 August 2014. He went on to score six times during the season as Leatherhead finished in 11th position, which Long described as a great achievement given it was the club's first season in the Premier Division following promotion.

He remained at Leatherhead for the start of the 2015–16 season, scoring his only goal of the season in a 4–4 draw with East Thurrock United on 5 September 2015, a match in which Leatherhead had trailed by three goals. Long was approached by former club Ebbsfleet in October 2015 regarding a vacant coaching position in the club's academy and U21 side, having already been a part of the club's academy coaching set-up. He subsequently took up the offer and in doing so made the decision to retire from playing football.

International career
Long captained the England under-16 team in 2000, which included Wayne Rooney, and represented his country at various youth levels. Long was named in the England C team, who represent England at non-League level, in February 2007, for a friendly against the Northern Ireland C team.

Coaching career
Long was initially appointed as lead development phase coach at Ebbsfleet United in July 2015, before later becoming an academy and under-21 coach in October 2015 when he retired from playing. He then took on both coaching and scouting responsibilities under Daryl McMahon. Long left Ebbsfleet on 16 November 2018 following the departure of McMahon, with new manager Garry Hill making changes to the club's back-room staff.

Career statistics

A.  The "Other" column constitutes appearances and goals (including those as a substitute) in the FA Trophy, Football League Trophy, play-offs and Sussex Senior Challenge Cup.

Honours
Ebbsfleet United
 FA Trophy: 2007–08

Stevenage
 Conference Premier: 2009–10
 FA Trophy runner-up: 2009–10
 League Two play-offs: 2010–11

References

External links

1985 births
Living people
Footballers from Bromley
English footballers
England youth international footballers
England semi-pro international footballers
Association football midfielders
Charlton Athletic F.C. players
Notts County F.C. players
Ebbsfleet United F.C. players
Stevenage F.C. players
AFC Wimbledon players
Eastbourne Borough F.C. players
Leatherhead F.C. players
English Football League players
National League (English football) players
People educated at Bishop Challoner School